The first season of the Australian family drama Always Greener began airing on 9 September 2001 and concluded on 3 June 2002 with a total of 22 episodes.

Cast

Regular
 John Howard as John Taylor
 Anne Tenney as Liz Taylor
 Michala Banas as Marissa Taylor
Daniel Bowden as Jason Taylor
 Abe Forsythe as Campbell Todd
Natasha Lee as Kim Taylor
 Scott Major as Tom Morgan
 Caitlin McDougall as Sandra Todd
Bree Walters as Philippa Todd
 Clayton Watson as Mickey Steele

Semi-Regular
Georgie Shew as Katy Turnball
 Denise Roberts as Isabelle Turnball
 Andrew Clarke as Derek Unn
Peter Corbett as Bert Adams
 Bree Desborough as Shelley Southall
 Grant Bowler as Greg Steele
Drayton Morley as Robert Todd

Recurring
Merridy Eastman as Eileen Unn
 Nathaniel Dean as Patch
 Steven Rooke as Nick Greenhill (episodes 16-22)

Guest
 Lynette Curran as Connie Linguini
 Alex Blias as Mark 'Skid' Pannas

Episodes

References

2001 Australian television seasons
2002 Australian television seasons